Morpher may refer to:

A device used to turn into a color suited Power Ranger
The morpher character class in Final Fantasy Tactics Advance

See also
Morph (disambiguation)